This is the list of Honorary Professors of Moscow State University. 

 Chinghiz Aitmatov, Russian/Kyrgyz novelist (2004)
 Askar Akayev, physicist, 1st President of Kyrgyzstan  (1996)
 Patriarch Alexy II of Moscow (1993)
 Zhores Alferov, physicist, Nobel Prize winner (2001)
 Heydar Aliyev, 3rd President of Azerbaijan (2008)
 Ilham Aliyev, 4th President of Azerbaijan (2008)
 Tatiana Anodina, aviation engineer,  the chairperson of the Interstate Aviation Committee (2015)
 Dario Antiseri, Italian philosopher (2002)
 Irina Arkhipova, opera singer (2001)
 Mykola Azarov, geologist, 14th Prime Minister of Ukraine (2014)
 Ban Ki-moon, South Korean politician, 8th Secretary-General of the United Nations (2008)
 Craig Barrett, American business executive, the CEO of Intel (2000)
 Leonid Berlyand, American mathematician (2017)
 John Bernal, British biophysicist and historian of science (1956)
 Klaus von Beyme, German political scientist (2010) 
 Giovanni Fabrizio Bignami, Italian astrophysicist (2013)
 Niels Bohr, Danish physicist, Nobel Prize winner (1961)
 Irina Bokova, Bulgarian politician, former Director-General of UNESCO (2011)
 , Italian astrophysicist (2010)
 Yevgeniy Chazov, physician and healthcare executive (2002)
 Viktor Chernomyrdin, industrialist and politician, 29th Prime Minister of Russia (1997)
 James Franklin Collins, American diplomat, a former United States Ambassador to Russia (2001)
 Arnaud Denjoy, French mathematician (1956)
 Fidel Felix Castro Diaz-Balart, Cuban politician, son of Fidel Castro, graduate of the Moscow State University (2013)
 Nikolai Dobronravov, poet (2015)
 , German physicist (2006)
 , American historian, specialist in Russian history (2005)
 Bertalan Farkas, Hungarian cosmonaut, first Esperantist in space (2015)
 Vladimir Fedoseyev, conductor, People's Artist of the USSR (2006)
 Gérard Férey, French chemist (2014)
 William Z. Foster, American communist, a chairman of the American Communist Party (1961)
 Juan Ramón de la Fuente, Mexican psychiatrist, healthcare and academic administrator (2006)
 Hans-Georg Gadamer, German philosopher (2000)
 Indira Gandhi, 3rd Prime Minister of India (1971)
 Valery Gergiev, conductor and opera company director (2001)
 Valéry Giscard d'Estaing, President of France (2015)
 , German chemist (2003)
Thomas Gries, Director of the RWTH Aachen Institute of Textile Technology (ITA) (2013)
 Stanislav Grof, Czech psychiatrist (2007)
 Marek Halter, French writer and journalist (1998)
 Dmitri Hvorostovsky, opera singer, People's Artist of Russia (2006)
 Daisaku Ikeda, Japanese Buddhist philosopher (2002)
 Paul Irwin, American Methodist minister and animal protection activist (2002)
 Gjorge Ivanov, 4th President of Macedonia (2014)
 Vladimir Jurowski, conductor (2016)
 Sergey Kapitsa, physicist and a host of a popular scientific TV show (2010)
 Islam Karimov, 1st President of Uzbekistan (2001)
 Anatoly Karpov, chess grandmaster and former World Champion (2001)
 Alyaksandr Kazulin, Belorussian mathematician, statesman and politician (2001)
 Mohammad Khatami, Iranian statesman, 5th President of Iran (2001)
 Patriarch Kirill of Moscow, Primate of the Russian Orthodox Church (2011)
 Aleksander Kwaśniewski, 3rd President of Poland (2004)
 Václav Klaus, 2nd President of the Czech Republic (2007)
 Rolf-Dieter Kluge, German Slavist (1995)
 Joseph Kobzon, singer, People's Artist of the USSR (2008)
 Andrei Konchalovsky, film director and screenwriter (2017)
 Mikhail Kovalchuk, physicist, Corresponding Member of the Russian Academy of Sciences (2016)
 , Dutch geologist (2008)
 Leonid Kuchma, 2nd President of Ukraine (1998)
 Li Lanqing, Chinese politician (2000)
 Alexander Lukashenko, President of Belarus (1996)
 Yury Luzhkov, 2nd Mayor of Moscow (1996)
 Carlos Alfredo Magariños, Argentine politician and UN official (1999)
 Vladislav Malkevich, economist and business executive, donated his art collection to the University (2016)
 Mirjana Marković, Yugoslav politician, widow of Slobodan Milošević (1996)
 Denis Matsuev, classical pianist (2011)
 Gérard Maugin, French engineering scientist (2001)
 Ekaterina Maximova, ballerina (1995)
 Dennis Meadows, American scientist and writer (2004)
 Ruslan Medzhitov, American immunologist (2012)
 , German fuel technologist (2015)
 Rustam Minnikhanov, 2nd President of Tatarstan (2016)
 Craig Mundie, American computer scientist, Microsoft executive (2006)
 , Finnish Slavist (1999)
 Yasuhiro Nakasone, Japanese politician, Prime Minister of Japan (1993)
 Nursultan Nazarbayev, 1st President of Kazakhstan (1996)
 Zdeněk Nejedlý, Czech writer, national thinker and statesman (1953)
 , Italian biophysicist (2010)
 Mikhail Nikolayev, 1st President of the Sakha republic in Russia (1996)
 Keizō Obuchi, Japanese politician, 54th Prime Minister of Japan (1998)
 Yury Osipov, mathematician and statesman, President of the Russian Academy of Sciences (1996)
 Aleksandra Pakhmutova, composer, People's Artist of the USSR (2015)
 Maya Plisetskaya, ballerina and choreographer (1993)
 Martyn Poliakoff, British chemist (1999)
 Yevgeny Primakov, arabist, foreign intelligence officer, politician (1998)
 Ernö Pungor, Hungarian chemist (1999)
 Sarvepalli Radhakrishnan, Indian philosopher and statesman, 2nd President of India (1956)
 Emomali Rahmon, 3rd President of Tajikistan (2009)
 Giovanni Reale, Italian historian of philosophy (2002)
 , First Lady of Portugal (2001)
 Vladimir Resin, politician, Mayor of Moscow (2002)
 Primo Rovis, Italian businessman, owner of a large collection of minerals; donated part of it to the University of Moscow (2005)
 John William Ryan, American academic administrator (1999)
 Serzh Sargsyan, Armenian politician, 3rd President of Armenia (2011)
 Rodion Shchedrin, composer (2007)
 Alexander Shokhin, politician (2007)
 Manmohan Singh, 13th Prime Minister of India (2005)
 Yury Solomin, actor and culture administrator (2013)
 Sen Sōshitsu XV, Japanese master of tea ceremony (1990)
 Valery Soyfer, Russian-American biophysicist and human rights advocate (2003)
 Vladimir Spivakov, conductor and violinist (2002)
 , German industrialist and writer (2000)
 Sukarno 1st President of Indonesia (1956)
 Yevgeny Svetlanov, conductor, composer, and pianist (1995)
 Oleg Tabakov, actor and theater administrator (2004)
 Valentina Tereshkova, cosmonaut, first woman to fly in space(2013)
 Zurab Tsereteli, sculptor and architect, President of the Russian Academy of Arts (2004)
 Seiji Tsutsumi, Japanese business executive, politician and poet (honorary visiting professor, 1982)
 Slobodan Unković, Serbian economist and academic administrator (1990)
 Vladimir Vasiliev, ballet dancer and choreographer (1995)
 Galina Vishnevskaya, opera singer (2007)
 James Watson, biologist, Nobel Prize (1962)
 Viktor Yanukovych, Ukrainian politician, 4th President of Ukraine (2010)
 Federico Mayor Zaragoza, Spanish scientist, diplomat and poet (1998) 
 Xi-Cheng Zhang, Chinese-born American physicist and scientific executive (2012)
 Yuri Zhdanov, chemist, son of Andrei Zhdanov (2003)
 Peter Ziegler, Swiss geologist (1998)
 Heiner Zieschang, German mathematician (1997)
 Lyudmila Zykina, folk singer (2002)

Reference 
site "Letopis MSU" (Chronicles of the Moscow State University, main source of information for this list) 

Academic staff of Moscow State University
State University
Moscow State University